Rainer Schlutter (born 14 September 1946) is a former East German football player.

Club career 
At club level, he made more than 230 East German top-flight appearances for FC Carl Zeiss Jena.

International career 
Schlutter won five caps for East Germany

References

External links
 
 
 

1946 births
Living people
People from Greiz
German footballers
East German footballers
Footballers from Thuringia
East Germany international footballers
Association football midfielders
DDR-Oberliga players
FC Carl Zeiss Jena players